The 1957 Singapore City Council elections was the first time that all appointed seats were scrapped, and all seats were opened for direct popular voting. Nomination day was on 18 November 1957, with voting held on 21 December in the same year.

A total of 32 seats were contested. Also up for contention, was the new office of Mayor of Singapore, which would be awarded to the leader of the political party with the majority of seats won.

Results

By constituency

External links
City Council Ordinary Elections 1957
The Workers' Party of Singapore - History - 1957-1963

Singapore City Council elections
1957 in Singapore
Singapore
December 1957 events in Asia